Geoffrey Lees (born 1 May 1951) is a former racing driver from England.  He participated in 12 Formula One World Championship Grands Prix, making his first appearance on 16 July 1978.  He scored no championship points.

Career
Lees was born near Kingsbury, Warwickshire. His first Grand Prix chance came with a non-works Ensign ran by Mario Deliotti, the owner of an Alfa Romeo dealership in Birmingham, at his home race in 1978. Lees failed to qualify. The following year he had a one-off drive for Tyrrell, before a more regular ride with the struggling Shadow team in 1980. Later that year he also drove for the works Ensign team, and failed to qualify a RAM-entered Williams in the US. He participated in the Formula One non-championship race held on 7 February 1981 at Kyalami for Theodore where he went into the crash barriers on lap 11 due to a broken front suspension. In the hope of taking one step backward and then two steps forward, he joined Ralt-Honda for the European Formula Two championship. He won the championship, but his hopes of "re-entering Formula One with more dignity" were quashed when Honda decided to spend another year developing their F1 engine. Lees, one year ahead of Honda failed to find a good seat at the highest level, and his F1 career petered out in 1982 with single drives for Theodore and Lotus.

In his Formula One career, Lees seemed stuck in uncompetitive cars, and when success proved elusive, he moved to Japan in the early 1980s. There he enjoyed a long career in the Japanese Formula Two, winning the 1983 title and collecting eight wins. He also represented various Japanese marques in sports car racing championships such as the Fuji Grand Champion Series, where he won three titles in 1986, 1988 and 1989, and the All Japan Sports Prototype Championship, where he got the C-class title in 1992. Lees became a highly paid and highly respected part of the Japanese racing scene. He has also driven at Le Mans numerous times, with his best finish being a sixth place overall in 1990.

Racing record

Complete British Saloon Car Championship results
(key) (Races in bold indicate pole position; races in italics indicate fastest lap.)

Complete European Formula Two Championship results
(key) (Races in bold indicate pole position; races in italics indicate fastest lap)

Complete Formula One World Championship results
(key)

24 Hours of Le Mans results

Sources

Profile at www.grandprix.com

1951 births
Living people
English racing drivers
English Formula One drivers
European Formula Two Championship drivers
Japanese Formula Two Championship drivers
Japanese Formula 3000 Championship drivers
Formula Ford drivers
24 Hours of Le Mans drivers
Tyrrell Formula One drivers
Shadow Formula One drivers
Ensign Formula One drivers
RAM Racing Formula One drivers
Theodore Formula One drivers
Team Lotus Formula One drivers
World Sportscar Championship drivers
British Formula One Championship drivers
24 Hours of Daytona drivers
Grand Champion Series drivers
TOM'S drivers
David Price Racing drivers
Long Distance Series drivers
Japanese Sportscar Championship drivers
Toyota Gazoo Racing drivers
Team LeMans drivers